John Martin Crawford (March 29, 1962 – December 16, 2020) was a Canadian serial killer. Crawford was convicted of killing four women in Saskatchewan and Alberta, between 1981 and 1992.

Crimes
Crawford was sentenced in 1981 to ten years' imprisonment for manslaughter in the killing of Mary Jane Serloin, in Lethbridge, Alberta. He was released from prison in 1989.

While under police surveillance, Crawford sexually assaulted Theresa Kematch, who was herself arrested, while Crawford was not.

In October 1994, a hunter came across the remains of the women in heavy brush outside of Saskatoon, Saskatchewan. In 1996, Crawford was convicted of one count of first degree murder and two counts of second-degree murder in the 1992 deaths of three Indigenous women identified as Eva Taysup, Shelley Napope, and Calinda Waterhen. Crawford was sentenced to three concurrent life sentences.

Popular culture

Literature
Crawford is discussed in Warren Goulding's book Just Another Indian, A Serial Killer and Canada's Indifference with the message that crimes against marginalized minorities go unheeded by an uncaring society at large. The theory is posited that Crawford's case was played down by the media because his victims were Aboriginal women.

Death
Crawford died on December 16, 2020, while serving his sentence at the Regional Psychiatric Centre in Saskatoon. No cause of death was released.

See also
List of serial killers by country

References

External links
Discrimination and violence against Indigenous women in Canada - Report Summary (mentions John Martin Crawford)

1962 births
2020 deaths
20th-century Canadian criminals
Canadian male criminals
Canadian people convicted of manslaughter
Canadian people convicted of murder
Canadian prisoners sentenced to life imprisonment
Canadian rapists
Canadian serial killers
Male serial killers
People convicted of murder by Canada
People from Steinbach, Manitoba
Prisoners sentenced to life imprisonment by Canada
Serial killers who died in prison custody
Violence against Indigenous women in Canada
Violence against women in Canada